Yapese may refer to:
Yap, one of the Caroline islands in Micronesia
Yap State, a state containing the island and surrounding islets
Yapese people, the native inhabitants of the island
Yapese language, their language